The 1959 U.S. Figure Skating Championships was held from January 29 through February 2 in Rochester, New York under the joint sponsorship of the Genesee Figure Skating Club and the Rochester Junior Chamber of Commerce. The main competition rink was the Rochester Community War Memorial, while the compulsory figures competition and practices were held at the Ritter-Clark Rink. Medals were awarded in three colors: gold (first), silver (second), and bronze (third) in four disciplines – men's singles, ladies' singles, pair skating, and ice dancing – across three levels: senior, junior, and novice.

The event determined the U.S. team for the 1959 World Championships.

Senior results
In all four divisions, the previous year's champions successfully defended their titles.

Men
David Jenkins won both the figures and the free skating portions, although he was closely pressed by Tim Brown in the first three figures. Jenkins's free skating was also of a very high standard.

Ladies
Carol Heiss gave one of the best free skating performances of her career. Carol's sister Nancy Heiss took the silver medal, with Barbara Ann Roles placing third in her first season as a senior-level competitor.

Pairs
Nancy Ludington / Ron Ludington repeated as champions in an event where all six teams entered gave fine performances. Ron Ludington also competed in the dance division, where he won the bronze medal with Judy Ann Lamar.

Ice dancing (Gold dance)
The title once again went to Andree Jacoby / Donald Jacoby, who had married since winning their first national championship the year before.

Junior results

Men

Ladies

Pairs

Ice dancing (Silver dance)

* Eliminated before Final Round

Novice results

Men

Ladies

Sources
 "The United States Championships", Skating magazine, March 1959

U.S. Figure Skating Championships
United States Figure Skating Championships, 1959
United States Figure Skating Championships, 1959
United States Figure Skating Championships
United States Figure Skating Championships